William John Beer (4 January 1879 – March 1941) was an English professional footballer who played as a wing half for Sheffield United and Small Heath (renamed Birmingham in 1905).

Playing career
He made over 100 appearances for Sheffield United and scored the third goal in their 4–1 defeat of Derby County in the 1899 FA Cup Final. Beer moved to Small Heath in January 1902 and the following season helped them to promotion back to the First Division. Later in his Birmingham career he played some games at centre-forward, which combined with his prowess at penalty-taking made him the club's joint leading scorer in the 1908–09 season.

Later career
He retired from football at the end of the next season, and emigrated to Australia where he became a sheep-farmer.

Returning to England in 1920, he became Birmingham's manager in 1923, taking charge of the team for four years in the First Division.

He was also a talented musician.

Honours
Sheffield United
 FA Cup winners 1899.
 First Division runners up 1900

Small Heath
 Second Division promotion 1903

Notes

References
General

Specific

1879 births
Footballers from Chesterfield
1941 deaths
English footballers
Association football midfielders
Sheffield United F.C. players
Birmingham City F.C. players
English football managers
Birmingham City F.C. managers
Place of death missing
FA Cup Final players